The Mission Hospital, (A Unit of Durgapur Medical Centre Pvt. Ltd.) is a 350-bed super-specialty hospital located in Durgapur, West Bengal, India. Built in an area spanning three acres, it offers an array of facilities – a digital flat panel Cath lab, seven major operation theatres, a 100-bed critical care unit, a mother and child care unit, a 24-hour accident and emergency department,and blood bank. Including, for the first time, a computerized pneumatic tube system (Sumetzberger, Germany). 

The Mission Hospital started its operation on April 2, 2008. This is the first specialty corporate hospital in Eastern India outside Kolkata.

Services and departments 
The Mission Hospital has the following departments:

Accident & Emergency Medicine, Anesthesiology,  Cardiology, Paediatric Cardiology, Cardio Thoracic & Vascular Surgery, Critical Care, Dentistry, Dermatology, Endocrinology, ENT, Gastroenterology & Gastrointestinal Surgery, General & Laparoscopic Surgery, General Medicine, Institute Of Laboratory Medicine & Research, Nephrology, Neurology & Neuro Surgery, Obstetrics & Gynaecology, Ophthalmology, Orthopaedics & Spine Surgery, Paediatrics & Neonatology, Plastic & Reconstructive Surgery, Psychiatry, Pulmonology/Respiratory Medicine, Radio-Diagnosis & Imaging Sciences, Transfusion Medicine, Urology & The Department of Physical Therapy and Rehabilitation.

See also
 List of hospitals in India

References

External links

Hospitals in West Bengal
Buildings and structures in Durgapur, West Bengal
Hospital buildings completed in 2008
2008  establishments in West Bengal